The Russian football club FC Dynamo Moscow has taken part in many European competitions. It reached the finals or semi-finals of the European Cup Winners' Cup three times between 1972 and 1985, and in the 2014–15 season has performed strongly in the UEFA Europa League, winning every game at the group stage and reaching Round of 16. At the end of that season, Dynamo was excluded from 2015–16 Europa League competition for violating Financial Fair Play break-even requirements and did not return to UEFA competitions until the 2020–21 season.

European Cup Winners' Cup 1968–69

Scheduled to play Górnik Zabrze , withdrew.

European Cup Winners' Cup 1971–72
Manager: Konstantin Beskov.

First round
 15 September 1971 / Olympiacos F.C.  – FC Dynamo Moscow 0–2 (Kozlov  ) / Karaiskakis Stadium, Piraeus / Attendance: 50,000
Olympiacos: Mylonas, Angelis, Synetopoulos, Siokos, Persidis, Papadopoulos, Koumarias, Karavitis (Papadimitriou, 46), Gaitatzis, Gioutsos, Delikaris.
FC Dynamo: Pilguy, Shtapov, Anichkin, Zykov, Maslov, Zhukov, Eshtrekov (Kozlov, 68), Sabo, Kozhemyakin (Grebnev, 84), Makhovikov, Yevryuzhikhin.
 30 September 1971 / FC Dynamo Moscow – Olympiacos F.C. 1–2 (Sabo  – Triantafyllos  Gaitatzis ) / Dynamo Stadium, Moscow / Attendance: 22,000
FC Dynamo: Pilguy, Shtapov, Anichkin, Zykov (Basalayev, 46), Maslov, Zhukov, Eshtrekov, Sabo, Kozhemyakin (Kozlov, 55), Makhovikov, Yevryuzhikhin.
Olympiacos: Karypidis, Zoannos, Synetopoulos, Persidis, Gaitatzis, Koureas, Papadimitriou, Karavitis (Papadopoulos, 70), Argyroudis (Pappas, 60), Triantafyllos, Gioutsos.

Second round
 20 October 1971 / Eskişehirspor  – FC Dynamo Moscow 0–1 (Kozlov ) / Eskişehir Atatürk Stadium, Eskişehir / Attendance: 15,000
Eskişehirspor: Taşkın, Abdurrahman, İsmail, Kamuran, Faik, Burhan İ., Vahap, Burhan T. (İlhan, 46), Halil, Fethi (captain), Şevki.
FC Dynamo: Pilguy, Basalayev, Anichkin, Grebnev, Dolbonosov, Makhovikov, Zhukov, Syomin, Baidachny, Kozlov, Yevryuzhikhin (Kozhemyakin, 46).
 3 November 1971 / FC Dynamo Moscow – Eskişehirspor 1–0 (Kozlov ) / Dynamo Stadium, Moscow / Attendance: 12,000
FC Dynamo: Balyasnikov, Basalayev, Anichkin, Zykov, Dolbonosov, Zhukov, Eshtrekov (Piskunov, 60), Sabo, Kozlov, Makhovikov, Yevryuzhikhin (Larin, 46).
Eskişehirspor: Taşkın, İlhan, Faik, Burhan İ. (Nihat, 35; Burhan T., 65), İsmail, Abdurrahman, Halil, Kamuran, Fethi (captain), Vahap, Süreyya.

Quarterfinals
 8 March 1972 / Red Star Belgrade  – FC Dynamo Moscow 1–2 (Filipović  – Kozhemyakin  Gershkovich ) / Stadion Crvena Zvezda, Belgrade / Attendance: 55,000
Red Star Belgrade: Dujković, Klenkovski, Bogićević (Krivokuća, 46), Pavlović, Dojčinovski, Keri, Janković, Karasi (Jovanović, 58), Filipović, Aćimović, Sušić.
FC Dynamo: Pilguy, Basalayev, Dolmatov, Zykov (captain), Sabo, Zhukov, Baidachny (Gershkovich, 81), Yakubik, Kozhemyakin, Makhovikov, Yevryuzhikhin (Kozlov, 66).
 22 March 1972 / FC Dynamo Moscow – Red Star Belgrade 1–1 (Kozhemyakin  – Krivokuća ) / Pakhtakor Markaziy Stadium, Tashkent / Attendance: 55,000
FC Dynamo: Pilguy, Basalayev, Dolmatov, Zykov (captain), Dolbonosov, Zhukov, Baidachny, Yakubik, Kozhemyakin, Makhovikov, Yevryuzhikhin.
Red Star Belgrade: Dujković, Đorić, Bogićević, Pavlović (captain), Dojčinovski, Krivokuća, Novković, Antonijević, Aćimović, Panajotović, Karasi.

Semifinals
 5 April 1972 / Dynamo Berlin  – FC Dynamo Moscow 1–1 (Johannsen  – Yevryuzhikhin ) / Friedrich Ludwig Jahn Sportpark, Berlin / Attendance: 30,000
Dynamo Berlin: Lihsa, Stumpf, Carow (captain), Hübner, Trümpler, Rohde, Terletzki, Schütze, Schulenberg, Netz, Johannsen.
FC Dynamo: Pilguy, Basalayev, Dolmatov, Zykov (captain), Sabo, Zhukov, Baidachny, Yakubik, Kozhemyakin, Makhovikov, Yevryuzhikhin.
 20 April 1972 / FC Dynamo Moscow – Dynamo Berlin 1–1 (Yevryuzhikhin  – Netz ); 4–1 in shootout Dolmatov  Baidachny  Yevryuzhikhin  Makhovikov  – Johannsen  Terletzki  Carow  / Druzhba Stadium, Lviv / Attendance: 30,000
FC Dynamo: Pilguy, Basalayev, Dolmatov, Zykov (captain), Sabo, Zhukov, Baidachny, Yakubik (Anichkin, 60), Kozhemyakin (Gershkovich, 48), Makhovikov, Yevryuzhikhin.
Dynamo Berlin: Lihsa, Stumpf, Carow (captain), Hübner, Trümpler, Rohde, Terletzki, Schütze (Becker, 112), Schulenberg, Netz (Brillat, 112), Johannsen.

Final

1974–75 UEFA Cup
Manager: Gavriil Kachalin.

First round
 18 September 1974 / Östers IF  – FC Dynamo Moscow 3–2 (Mattsson  Nordenberg  – Kozlov  Pavlenko ) / Värendsvallen, Växjö / Attendance: 5,000
Östers IF: Hagberg, Andersson, Nordenberg, Arvidsson, Bild, Linderoth, T. Svensson (captain) (Isaxon, 46), Blomqvist, Ejderstedt, Mattsson, Bergqvist (P. Svensson, 65).
FC Dynamo: Pilguy, Basalayev, Nikulin, Komarov, Dolbonosov (captain), Petrushin, Pudyshev, Makhovikov (Gavrilov, 75), Kozlov, Pavlenko, Yevryuzhikhin.
 2 October 1974 / FC Dynamo Moscow – Östers IF 2–1 (Yevryuzhikhin  Petrushin  – T. Svensson ) / Dynamo Stadium, Moscow / Attendance: 27,000
FC Dynamo: Pilguy, Basalayev, Nikulin, Zykov, Dolbonosov (captain), Petrushin (Yakubik, 70), Pudyshev, Kozlov (Kozhemyakin, 65), Pavlenko, Makhovikov, Yevryuzhikhin.
Östers IF: Karlsson, Andersson, Nordenberg, Arvidsson, Bild, Linderoth, T. Svensson (captain), Blomqvist, Söderqvist (P. Svensson, 77), Mattsson, Bergqvist.

Second round
 23 October 1974 / Dynamo Dresden  – FC Dynamo Moscow 1–0 (Sachse ) / Dynamo Stadium, Dresden / Attendance: 10,000
Dynamo Dresden: Boden, Helm, Dörner, Schmuck, Wätzlich, Häfner, Geyer, Kreische (captain), Sachse (Riedel, 75), Richter, Kotte.
FC Dynamo: Pilguy, Basalayev, Nikulin, Zykov, Dolbonosov (captain), Petrushin, Yakubik, Kozlov, Pavlenko, Makhovikov (Pudyshev, 75), Yevryuzhikhin.
 6 November 1974 / FC Dynamo Moscow – Dynamo Dresden 1–0 (Kurnenin ) 3–4 in shootout (Yevryuzhikhin  Yakubik  Makhovikov  Basalayev  Dolmatov  – Wätzlich  Dörner  Kreische  Sachse  Kotte ) / Dynamo Stadium, Moscow / Attendance: 10,000
FC Dynamo: Pilguy, Basalayev, Nikulin, Zykov, Dolbonosov (captain), Petrushin (Pudyshev, 85), Dolmatov, Kurnenin (Yakubik, 117), Pavlenko, Makhovikov, Yevryuzhikhin.
Dynamo Dresden: Boden, Helm, Dörner, Schmuck, Wätzlich, Häfner, Geyer, Kreische (captain), Riedel (Sachse, 114), Richter (Heidler, 72), Kotte.

1976–77 UEFA Cup
Manager: Aleksandr Sevidov.

First round
 15 September 1976 / AEK Athens F.C.  – FC Dynamo Moscow 2–0 (Nikoloudis  Papaioannou ) / Nikos Goumas, Athens / Attendance: 25,000
AEK Athens F.C.: Stergioudas, Theodoridis, Zahnleitner, Nikolaou, Ravousis, Tsamis, Tasos (Dedes, 55), Nikoloudis, Wagner, Papaioannou (captain), Mavros.
FC Dynamo: Gontar, Parov, Novikov, Bubnov, Makhovikov, Minayev, Gershkovich (Petrushin, 46), Dolmatov, Yakubik, Kazachyonok (Pavlenko, 56), Yevryuzhikhin.
 29 September 1976 / FC Dynamo Moscow – AEK Athens F.C. 2–1 (Bubnov  Yakubik  – Tasos ) / Dynamo Stadium, Moscow / Attendance: 10,000
FC Dynamo: Gontar, Parov, Nikulin, Bubnov, Makhovikov, Minayev, Dolmatov, Gavrilov (Kramarenko, 46), Yakubik, Gershkovich (Novikov, 118), Kazachyonok.
AEK Athens F.C.: Stergioudas, Theodoridis (Zahnleitner, 80), Intzoglou, Ravousis, Nikolaou, Dedes (Tasos, 64), Tsamis, Nikoloudis, Wagner, Papaioannou (captain), Mavros.

European Cup Winners' Cup 1977–78
Manager: Aleksandr Sevidov.

First round
 17 September 1977 / Valletta F.C.  – FC Dynamo Moscow 0–2 (Kazachyonok  Maksimenkov ) / City Stadium, Valletta / Attendance: 15,000
Valletta F.C.: Debono, Gauci, Galea, Abdilla, Fenech, E. Farrugia, Magro, Demajo (Giglio, 80), Agius (Batada, 68), L. Farrugia, Seychell (captain).
FC Dynamo: Gontar, Parov, Bubnov, Nikulin, Makhovikov, Petrushin, Minayev, Dolmatov (captain), Maksimenkov, Gershkovich (Yakubik, 70), Kazachyonok (Kolesov, 85).
 29 September 1977 / FC Dynamo Moscow – Valletta F.C. 5–0 (Kolesov    Yakubik  Kazachyonok ) / Dynamo Stadium, Moscow / Attendance: 10,000
FC Dynamo: Gontar, Parov, Bubnov, Nikulin (Maksimenkov, 46), Makhovikov, Petrushin, Minayev, Dolmatov, Yakubik, Kolesov, Kazachyonok (Gershkovich, 66).
Valletta F.C.: Debono, Gauci, Galea, Abdilla, Fenech, E. Farrugia, Magro, Giglio, Agius, L. Farrugia, Seychell (captain).

Second round
 19 October 1977 / FC Dynamo Moscow – Universitatea Craiova  2–0 (Kazachyonok  Minayev ) / Dynamo Stadium, Moscow / Attendance: 5,000
FC Dynamo: Gontar, Parov, Novikov, Nikulin, Makhovikov, Bubnov, Petrushin, Minayev, Gershkovich (Yakubik, 60; Kramarenko, 79), Kolesov, Kazachyonok.
Universitatea Craiova: Boldici, Negrilă, Tilihoi, Purima, Cârţu (Ungureanu, 84), Ştefănescu (captain), Crişan, Balaci, Cămătaru, Ţicleanu (Irimescu, 71), Marcu.
 2 November 1977 / Universitatea Craiova – FC Dynamo Moscow 2–0 (Cârţu  Beldeanu ) 0–3 in shootout (Beldeanu  Ştefănescu  Negrilă  – Kazachyonok  Maksimenkov  Petrushin ) / Stadionul Central, Craiova / Attendance: 25,000
Universitatea Craiova: Boldici (Lung, 55), Tilihoi, Ţicleanu, Purima, Cârţu, Ştefănescu (captain), Crişan (Negrilă, 68), Balaci, Cămătaru, Beldeanu, Marcu.
FC Dynamo: Gontar, Parov, Novikov (Yakubik, 34), Bubnov, Makhovikov, Dolmatov (captain), Petrushin, Minayev, Maksimenkov, Kolesov (Gershkovich, 75), Kazachyonok.

Quarterfinals
 2 March 1978 / Real Betis  – FC Dynamo Moscow 0–0 / Estadio Benito Villamarín, Seville / Attendance: 50,000
Real Betis: Esnaola, Sabaté, Gordillo, López, Biosca, Mühren (Bizcocho, 83), Garcia Soriano (Del Pozo, 75), Alabanda, Eulate, Cardeñosa, Anzarda.
FC Dynamo: Gontar, Parov, Novikov, Kazachyonok, Bubnov, Petrushin, Gershkovich, Dolmatov, Yakubik, Maksimenkov,  Minayev.
 15 March 1978 / FC Dynamo Moscow – Real Betis 3–0 (Gershkovich  Kazachyonok  Mühren ) / Dinamo Stadium, Tbilisi / Attendance: 60,000
FC Dynamo: Gontar (Pilguy, 87), Parov (Nikulin, 87), Kazachyonok, Makhovikov, Bubnov, Petrushin, Gershkovich, Dolmatov, Yakubik, Maksimenkov,  Minayev.
Real Betis: Esnaola, Bizcocho, Cobo (Del Pozo, 30), Mühren, Biosca, López, Garcia Soriano (Anzarda, 82), Alabanda, Cabezas, Cardeñosa, Gordillo.

Semifinals
 29 March 1978 / FC Dynamo Moscow – FK Austria Wien  2–1 (Tsereteli  Gershkovich  – Baumeister ) / Dinamo Stadium, Tbilisi / Attendance: 65,000
FC Dynamo: Gontar, Parov, Kazachyonok, Makhovikov, Bubnov, Petrushin (Novikov, 78), Gershkovich, Dolmatov, Yakubik (Tsereteli, 72), Maksimenkov,  Minayev.
FK Austria Wien: Baumgartner, R. Sara (captain), Obermayer, Baumeister, Daxbacher, Martínez, Parits, Prohaska, Pirkner, Gasselich, Morales.
 12 April 1978 / FK Austria Wien – FC Dynamo Moscow 2–1 (Pirkner  Morales  – Yakubik ) 5–4 in shootout (Obermayer  Morales  Pirkner  Martínez  Prohaska  – Kazachyonok  Maksimenkov  Yakubik  Tsereteli  Bubnov ) / Praterstadion, Vienna / Attendance: 75,000
FK Austria Wien: Baumgartner, R. Sara (captain), Obermayer, Baumeister, Morales, J. Sara, Drazan (Pospischil, 87), Parits, Prohaska, Pirkner, Gasselich (Martínez, 83).
FC Dynamo: Gontar, Parov (Tsereteli, 54), Novikov, Makhovikov, Bubnov, Petrushin, Gershkovich (Yakubik, 65), Dolmatov, Kazachyonok, Maksimenkov,  Minayev.

European Cup Winners' Cup 1979–80
Manager: Ivan Mozer.

First round
 Scheduled to play KS Vllaznia Shkodër , Vllaznia withdrew.

Second round
 24 October 1979 / FC Dynamo Moscow – Boavista F.C.  0–0 / Luzhniki Stadium, Moscow / Attendance: 5,000
FC Dynamo: Gontar, Novikov, Nikulin, Makhovikov (captain), Bubnov, Petrushin, Tolstykh (Kolesov, 46), Minayev, Reznik (Pavlenko, 75), Maksimenkov, Gazzaev.
Boavista: Matos, Barbosa, Taí, Eliseu, Adão, Artur, Almeidinha (Jarbas Dantas, 76), Óscar (Moinhos, 60), Salvador, Ailton, Júlio.
 7 November 1979 / Boavista F.C. – FC Dynamo Moscow 1–1 (Moinhos  – Minayev ) / Boavista Stadium, Porto / Attendance: 27,000
Boavista: Matos, Barbosa, Taí, Eliseu, Adão, Artur (captain), Almeidinha (Óscar, 65), Moinhos, Júlio, Ailton, Folha (Salvador, 46). 
FC Dynamo: Gontar, Novikov, Nikulin, Makhovikov (captain), Bubnov, Petrushin, Kolesov, Minayev, Reznik (Pavlenko, 86),  Maksimenkov, Gazzaev.

Quarterfinals
 5 March 1980 / FC Dynamo Moscow – FC Nantes  0–2 (Tusseau  Pécout ) / Dinamo Stadium, Tbilisi / Attendance: 30,000
FC Dynamo: Gontar, Lovchev, Nikulin, Makhovikov (captain), Bubnov, Petrushin (Latysh, 61), Reznik, Minayev, Yakubik, Maksimenkov, Gazzaev.
FC Nantes: Bertrand-Demanes, Ayache, Tusseau, Rio (Bibard, 84), E. Trossero, Baronchelli, V. Trossero, Michel (captain), Pécout, Rampillon, Amisse.
 19 March 1980 / FC Nantes – FC Dynamo Moscow 2–3 (Michel  Touré  – Minayev  Gazzaev  Kolesov ) / Stade Marcel Saupin, Nantes / Attendance: 25,000
FC Nantes: Bertrand-Demanes, Bossis, Tusseau, Rio, E. Trossero, Baronchelli, V. Trossero (Touré, 64), Michel (captain), Pécout, Muller, Rampillon.
FC Dynamo: Pilguy, Lovchev, Nikulin, Makhovikov (captain), Bubnov, Petrushin, Kolesov, Minayev, Novikov (Yakubik, 84), Maksimenkov, Gazzaev.

1980–81 UEFA Cup
Manager: Vyacheslav Solovyov.

First round
 17 September 1980 / KSC Lokeren  – FC Dynamo Moscow 1–1 (Verheyen  – V. Gazzaev  V. Gazzaev ) / Daknamstadion, Lokeren / Attendance: 18,000
KSC Lokeren: Hoogenboom, Ingels, Snelders, Verbruggen, De Schrijver (captain), Elkjær, Verheyen, Somers, Lubański (Van Cauter, 82), Mommens, Lato.
FC Dynamo: Pilguy (captain), Reznik, Nikulin, Novikov, Bubnov, Petrushin, Matyunin (Moiseyev, 85), Minayev, Tolstykh,  Maksimenkov, V. Gazzaev.
 1 October 1980 / FC Dynamo Moscow – KSC Lokeren 0–1 (Verheyen ) / Dynamo Stadium, Moscow / Attendance: 11,000
FC Dynamo: Pilguy (captain), Novikov, Nikulin, Tolstykh, Bubnov, Petrushin, Latysh, Minayev, Reznik (Kolesov, 56; Yu. Gazzaev, 84), Maksimenkov, Matyunin.
KSC Lokeren: Hoogenboom, Ingels (Dalving, 46), Snelders, Verbruggen, De Schrijver, Elkjær, Verheyen, Somers (captain), Lato (Van Cauter, 80), Mommens, Guðjohnsen.

1982–83 UEFA Cup
Manager: Vyacheslav Solovyov.

First round
 15 September 1982 / Śląsk Wrocław  – FC Dynamo Moscow 2–2 (Sybis  Socha  – Mentyukov  Dzhavadov ) / Olympic Stadium, Wrocław / Attendance: 17,000
Śląsk Wrocław: Kostrzewa, Sobiesiak, Kopycki, Król, Majewski, Faber (captain), Pękala, Tarasiewicz, Prusik (Mikołajewicz, 78), Sybis, Socha (Ptak, 58).
FC Dynamo: Gontar, Golovnya, Nikulin, Makhovikov, Novikov, Mentyukov, Latysh (Tkebuchava, 61; Matyunin, 88), Minayev (captain), Tolstykh, Molodtsov, Dzhavadov.
 29 September 1982 / FC Dynamo Moscow – Śląsk Wrocław 0–1 (Tarasiewicz ) / Dynamo Stadium, Moscow / Attendance: 12,000
FC Dynamo: Gontar, Golovnya (Shevtsov, 46), Nikulin, Makhovikov, Novikov, Mentyukov, Latysh, Minayev (captain), Tolstykh, Molodtsov (Adzhoyev, 46), Dzhavadov.
Śląsk Wrocław: Kostrzewa, Sobiesiak, Majewski, Kopycki, Król, Faber (captain), Tarasiewicz, Pękala (Nocko, 25), Prusik, Kowalczyk (Socha, 84), Sybis.

European Cup Winners' Cup 1984–85
Manager: Aleksandr Sevidov.

First round
 19 September 1984 / FC Dynamo Moscow – HNK Hajduk Split  1–0 (Argudyayev ) / Dynamo Stadium, Moscow / Attendance: 14,200
FC Dynamo: Prudnikov, Bulanov, Novikov (captain), Fomichyov, Golovnya, Khapsalis, Ataulin, Pudyshev, Argudyayev (Molodtsov, 87), Karatayev, Gazzaev.
HNK Hajduk Split: Pudar, Španjić, Dražic, Gudelj (captain), Andrijašević, Čelić, Zlatko Vujović (Bućan, 77), Šalov, Zoran Vujović, Asanović, Prekazi (Macan, 78).
 3 October 1984 / HNK Hajduk Split – FC Dynamo Moscow 2–5 (Deverić  Vujović  – Gazzaev    Bulanov  Khapsalis ) / Gradski vrt, Osijek / Attendance: 40,000
HNK Hajduk Split: Pudar, Andrijašević, Gudelj (captain), Bakrač (Španjić, 71),  Čelić, Zlatko Vujović, Slišković, Šalov (Dražic, 71), Asanović, Deverić.
FC Dynamo: Prudnikov, Bulanov, Novikov (captain), Fomichyov, Golovnya, Khapsalis, Ataulin, Pudyshev (Silkin, 81), Argudyayev (Chesnokov, 71), Karatayev, Gazzaev.

Second round
 24 October 1984 / FC Dynamo Moscow – Ħamrun Spartans F.C.  5–0 (Gazzaev   Karatayev  Khapsalis  Bulanov ) / Dynamo Stadium, Moscow / Attendance: 7,300
FC Dynamo: Prudnikov, Bulanov, Novikov (captain), Fomichyov, Golovnya, Khapsalis, Ataulin, Pudyshev (Matyunin, 70), Argudyayev, Karatayev, Gazzaev (Mentyukov, 70).
Ħamrun Spartans F.C.: Zammit, Farrugia (captain), Alex Azzopardi, Grech, G. Xuereb, Alfred Azzopardi (Salerno, 81), L. Refalo, Robertson, Stegner (G. Refalo, 53), R. Xuereb, Degiorgio.
 7 November 1984 / Ħamrun Spartans F.C. – FC Dynamo 0–1 (Chesnokov ) / Central Stadium, Ħamrun / Attendance: 7,000
Ħamrun Spartans F.C.: Zammit, Farrugia, Alex Azzopardi, Grech, G. Xuereb, Alfred Azzopardi, L. Refalo, G. Refalo (Stegner, 46), Degiorgio, Robertson (captain), R. Xuereb, Consiglio.
FC Dynamo: Prudnikov, Matyunin, Novikov (captain), Fomichyov, Golovnya, Khapsalis (Bulanov, 46), Ataulin, Pudyshev, Chesnokov, Karatayev, Argudyayev (Borodyuk, 46).

Quarterfinals
 6 March 1985 / Larissa F.C.  – FC Dynamo Moscow 0–0 / Alkazar, Larissa / Attendance: 17,000
Larissa F.C.: Plitsis, Parafestas (captain), Patsiavouras, Mitsibonas, Galitsios, Voutiritsas, Ziogas (Tsiolis, 87), Kmiecik, Adamczyk, Andreoudis (Christodoulou, 87), Valaoras.
FC Dynamo: Prudnikov, Silkin, Novikov (captain), Fomichyov, Golovnya, Vasilyev (Stukashov, 77), Ataulin, Pudyshev, Borodyuk (Molodtsov, 63), Karatayev, Gazzaev.
 20 March 1985 / FC Dynamo Moscow – Larissa F.C. 1–0 (Fomichyov ) / Dinamo Stadium, Tbilisi / Attendance: 16,200
FC Dynamo: Prudnikov (captain), Silkin, Novikov, Fomichyov, Golovnya, Khapsalis, Ataulin, Vasilyev, Stukashov (Pudyshev, 68), Karatayev (Borodyuk, 86), Gazzaev.
Larissa F.C.: Plitsis, Parafestas (captain), Patsiavouras, Mitsibonas, Galitsios, Voutiritsas, Ziogas (Tsiolis, 40; Rigas, 68), Kmiecik, Adamczyk, Andreoudis, Valaoras.

Semifinals
 10 April 1985 / SK Rapid Wien  – FC Dynamo Moscow 3–1 (Lainer  Krankl  Hrstic  – Karatayev ) / Gerhard Hanappi Stadium, Vienna / Attendance: 20,000
SK Rapid Wien: Konsel, Lainer, Pregesbauer (Hrstic, 46), Garger, Weinhofer, Panenka (Stadler, 85), Brauneder, Willfurth, Kranjčar, Krankl (captain), Pacult.
FC Dynamo: Prudnikov (captain), Silkin, Novikov, Pozdnyakov, Bulanov, Khapsalis (Borodyuk, 76), Ataulin, Vasilyev (Pudyshev, 67), Stukashov, Karatayev, Gazzaev.
 24 April 1985 / FC Dynamo Moscow – SK Rapid Wien 1–1 (Pozdnyakov  – Panenka ) / Dynamo Stadium, Moscow / Attendance: 50,000
FC Dynamo: Prudnikov (captain), Bulanov, Novikov, Pozdnyakov, Golovnya, Khapsalis (Matyunin, 75), Ataulin, Vasilyev, Stukashov, Karatayev, Molodtsov (Pudyshev, 23).
SK Rapid Wien: Konsel, Lainer, Garger, Brauneder, Weber, Kienast, Panenka (Hrstic, 67), Krankl (captain), Bručić, Pacult (Willfurth, 60).

1987–88 UEFA Cup
Manager: Eduard Malofeyev.

First round
 16 September 1987 / Grasshopper Club Zürich  – FC Dynamo Moscow 0–4 (Borodyuk    Karatayev ) / Hardturm, Zürich / Attendance: 30,000
Grasshopper Club Zürich: Brunner, Bianchi (De Siebenthal, 46), Stutz, Egli (captain), Andermatt, Imhof, Koller, Paulo César, Larsen, Ponte, Gren.
FC Dynamo: Prudnikov (captain) (Uvarov, 85), Losev, Timoshenko (Sklyarov, 74), Novikov, Silkin, Dobrovolsky, Bulanov, Vasilyev, Stukashov, Karatayev, Borodyuk.
 30 September 1987 / FC Dynamo Moscow – Grasshopper Club Zürich 1–0 (Vasilyev ) / Dynamo Stadium, Moscow / Attendance: 16,300
FC Dynamo: Prudnikov (captain), Losev, Kolyvanov (Sklyarov, 86), Novikov, Silkin, Dobrovolsky, Bulanov, Vasilyev, Stukashov, Karatayev, Borodyuk.
Grasshopper Club Zürich: Brunner, Stiel, Stutz, Egli (captain), Andermatt, Larsen, Koller, Paulo César, Imhof, Ponte (Bachini, 63), De Siebenthal.

Second round
 21 October 1987 / FC Barcelona  – FC Dynamo Moscow 2–0 (Amarilla  Schuster ) / Camp Nou, Barcelona / Attendance: 26,000
FC Barcelona: Zubizarreta, Gerardo, Migueli, Julio Alberto, Víctor Muñoz (Calderé, 72), Alexanco (captain), Amarilla, Schuster, Roberto, Lineker, Urbano.
FC Dynamo: Prudnikov (captain), Losev, Timoshenko, Sklyarov, Silkin, Dobrovolsky, Bulanov, Vasilyev (Demidov, 66), Stukashov (Kolyvanov, 53), Karatayev, Borodyuk.
 4 November 1987 / FC Dynamo Moscow – FC Barcelona 0–0 / Dynamo Stadium, Moscow / Attendance: 24,500
FC Dynamo: Prudnikov (captain), Morozov, Sklyarov, Timoshenko, Silkin, Dobrovolsky, Bulanov, Vasilyev, Stukashov, Karatayev (Kiriakov, 61), Borodyuk.
FC Barcelona: Zubizarreta, Gerardo (Salva, 63), Alexanco (captain), Julio Alberto, Víctor Muñoz, Moratalla, Carrasco, Schuster, Calderé, Lineker, Urbano.

1991–92 UEFA Cup
Manager: Valery Gazzaev.

First round
 18 September 1991 / Vaci Izzo MTE  – FC Dynamo Moscow 1–0 (Hahn ) / Stadion Városi Vác, Vác / Attendance: 8,000
Vaci Izzo MTE: Koszta, Bereczki (Puglits, 46), Hahn, Luis Carlos, Kriska (Horváth, 83), Simon, Romanek, Zombori, Orosz, Vig, Füle.
FC Dynamo: Smetanin, Losev (captain), Sklyarov, Tsaryov, Chernyshov, Kobelev, Smertin, Pankratjevas, Kolyvanov, Leonenko (Simutenkov, 71), Tetradze (Sereda, 37).
 2 October 1991 / FC Dynamo Moscow – Vaci Izzo MTE 4–1 (Kobelev  Kiriakov  Kolyvanov   – Romanek ) / Dynamo Stadium, Moscow / Attendance: 4,300
FC Dynamo: Smetanin, Tsaryov, Sklyarov (Timoshenko, 61), Tetradze, Chernyshov, Kobelev, Smertin, Derkach, Kolyvanov, Leonenko, Kiriakov (Pankratjevas, 67).
Vaci Izzo MTE: Koszta, Nagy, Hahn, Horváth, Puglits, Kriska, Romanek, Zombori (Nyilas, 82), Bánföldi (Repasi, 65), Vig, Füle.

Second round
 22 October 1991 / AS Cannes  – FC Dynamo Moscow 0–1 (Kiriakov ) / Stade Pierre de Coubertin, Cannes / Attendance: 14,000
AS Cannes: Dussuyer, Sassus, Dréossi, Koot, Bray (Omam-Biyik, 46), Guérit, Daniel, Durix, Langers, Asanović (Priou, 61), Zidane.
FC Dynamo: Smetanin, Tsaryov, Sklyarov, Dolgov, Chernyshov, Kobelev, Timoshenko, Tetradze, Kolyvanov, Leonenko (Smertin, 85), Kiriakov (Simutenkov, 88).
 6 November 1991 / FC Dynamo Moscow – AS Cannes 1–1 (Kobelev  – Omam-Biyik ) / Dynamo Stadium, Moscow / Attendance: 6,200
FC Dynamo: Smetanin, Tsaryov, Sklyarov (Smertin, 46), Dolgov, Chernyshov, Kobelev (captain), Timoshenko, Tetradze, Kolyvanov, Leonenko, Kiriakov (Simutenkov, 88).
AS Cannes: Dussuyer, Sassus, Dréossi, Koot, Fernández, Guérit, Omam-Biyik, Bray (Zidane, 75), Daniel, Asanović, Priou (Langers, 75).

Third round
 27 November 1991 / K.A.A. Gent  – FC Dynamo Moscow 2–0 (Vandenbergh  Van Der Linden ) / Jules Ottenstadion, Ghent / Attendance: 18,347
K.A.A. Gent: Petry, Verkuyl, Verdegem (Herbots, 72), Dauwen, De Groote (Porte, 16), Vangronsveld, Janssens, Medved, Vandenbergh, Viscaal, Van Der Linden.
FC Dynamo: Smetanin, Pankratjevas, Tsaryov, Tetradze, Chernyshov (captain), Drozdov, Smertin, Timoshenko (Sereda, 40), Simutenkov,  Leonenko, Kiriakov (But, 88).
 11 December 1991 / FC Dynamo Moscow – K.A.A. Gent 0–0 (Derkach  Losev ) / Lokomotiv Stadium, Simferopol / Attendance: 6,300
FC Dynamo: Smetanin, Losev, Tsaryov, Dolgov, Tetradze, Kobelev, Smertin, Derkach, Simutenkov,  Leonenko, Kiriakov.
K.A.A. Gent: Petry, Verkuyl, Verdegem, Dauwen, Herbots (Maes, 82), Vangronsveld, Janssens, Medved, Porte, Viscaal (Balenga, 87), Van Der Linden.

1992–93 UEFA Cup
Manager: Valery Gazzaev.

First round
 16 September 1992 / FC Dynamo Moscow – Rosenborg BK  5–1 (Sklyarov   Timofeev  Simutenkov  Tetradze  – Løken ) / Dynamo Stadium, Moscow / Attendance: 6,500
FC Dynamo: Kleimyonov, Timofeev, Sklyarov (captain), Tskhadadze, Kalitvintsev (Spanderashvili, 88), Hovhannisyan, Smertin (Drozdov, 71), Tsaryov, Tetradze, Gasimov, Simutenkov.
Rosenborg BK: Rise, Husby, Tangen, Bragstad (Kvarme, 46), Bjørnebye, Ingebrigtsen, Leonhardsen, Skammelsrud, Sørloth, Dahlum (Strand, 73), Løken.
 30 September 1992 / Rosenborg BK – FC Dynamo Moscow 2–0 (Ingebrigtsen  Løken ) / Lerkendal stadion, Trondheim / Attendance: 10,218
Rosenborg BK: Rise, Husby, Tangen, Bragstad, Bjørnebye, Ingebrigtsen, Leonhardsen, Skammelsrud, Løken, Sørloth, Dahlum.
FC Dynamo: Kleimyonov, Tsaryov, Sklyarov, Tskhadadze, Kalitvintsev, Kobelev (captain), Smertin, Derkach, Hovhannisyan, Gasimov (Spanderashvili, 88), Simutenkov (Drozdov, 70).

Second round
 22 October 1992 / Torino F.C.  – FC Dynamo Moscow 1–2 (Timofeev  – Gasimov  Simutenkov ) / Stadio delle Alpi, Turin / Attendance: 26,943
Torino F.C.: Marchegiani, Bruno, Sergio (Silenzi, 72), Fortunato, Annoni (Mussi, 77), Fusi, Sordo, Casagrande, Aguilera, Scifo, Venturin.
FC Dynamo: Kleimyonov, Timofeev, Sklyarov (Varlamov, 84), Tskhadadze, Tsaryov, Kobelev (captain), Smertin, Derkach, Tetradze, Gasimov (Hovhannisyan, 88), Simutenkov.
 5 November 1992 / FC Dynamo Moscow – Torino F.C. 0–0 (Simutenkov  – Annoni ) / Dynamo Stadium, Moscow / Attendance: 13,000
FC Dynamo: Kleimyonov, Timofeev, Sklyarov, Tskhadadze, Kalitvintsev (Tsaryov, 66), Kobelev (captain), Varlamov, Derkach, Tetradze, Gasimov (Hovhannisyan, 87), Simutenkov.
Torino F.C.: Marchegiani, Bruno, Sergio, Mussi, Annoni, Fusi (Silenzi, 47), Sordo (Poggi, 74), Casagrande, Aguilera, Scifo, Venturin.

Third round
 25 November 1992 / FC Dynamo Moscow – S.L. Benfica  2–2 (Kalitvintsev  Derkach  – Isaías  ) / Torpedo Stadium, Moscow / Attendance: 8,700
FC Dynamo: Kleimyonov, Hovhannisyan (Kovardayev, 55), Sklyarov, Tskhadadze, Kalitvintsev, Kobelev (captain), Smertin (Savchenko, 84), Derkach, Tetradze, Gasimov, Varlamov.
S.L. Benfica: Silvino, José Carlos, Hélder, William, Veloso, Schwarz, Vítor Paneira, Sousa, Mostovoi, Yuran (Paulo Madeira, 79), Isaías.
 8 December 1992 / S.L. Benfica – FC Dynamo Moscow 2–0 (Isaías  Yuran ) / Estádio da Luz, Lisbon / Attendance: 67,000
S.L. Benfica: Silvino, José Carlos, Hélder, William, Veloso, Schwarz, Vítor Paneira (Rui Águas, 65), Sousa, Rui Costa, Yuran (Pacheco, 82), Isaías.
FC Dynamo: Kleimyonov, Timofeev, Sklyarov, Tskhadadze, Kalitvintsev, Kobelev (captain) (Varlamov, 69), Smertin (Savchenko, 75), Derkach, Tetradze, Gasimov, Tsaryov.

1993–94 UEFA Cup
Managers: Valery Gazzaev (first leg), Adamas Golodets (second leg).

First round
 14 September 1993 / FC Dynamo Moscow – Eintracht Frankfurt  0–6 (Gaudino  Weber  Furtok  Bein  Okocha  Yeboah ) / Dynamo Stadium, Moscow / Attendance: 14,000
FC Dynamo: Smetanin, Selezov, Kovtun, Smertin, Kalitvintsev, Chernyshov, Tedeyev, Cheryshev, Tetradze, Dobrovolsky (captain), Rybakov (Nekrasov, 46).
Eintracht Frankfurt: Stein, Roth, Weber, Bindewald, Binz, Gaudino, Komljenović, Dickhaut, Yeboah, Bein (Okocha, 64), Furtok.
 28 September 1993 / Eintracht Frankfurt – FC Dynamo Moscow 1–2 (Furtok  – Simutenkov  Dobrovolsky ) / Waldstadion, Frankfurt am Main / Attendance: 4,900
Eintracht Frankfurt: Stein, Tskhadadze, Weber, Roth, Binz, Gaudino (Dickhaut, 65), Falkenmayer, Bindewald, Andersen, Bein, Furtok (Hagner, 71).
FC Dynamo: Kleimyonov, Selezov, Krutov (Nekrasov, 71), Smertin, Kalitvintsev, Chernyshov, Tedeyev, Cheryshev (Savchenko, 86), Tetradze, Dobrovolsky (captain), Simutenkov.

1994–95 UEFA Cup
Manager: Konstantin Beskov.

First round
 13 September 1994 / R.F.C. Seraing  – FC Dynamo Moscow 3–4 (Wamberto  Schaessens  Edmílson  – Smirnov  Cheryshev   Simutenkov ) / Pairay Stadium, Seraing / Attendance: 7,172
R.F.C. Seraing: Huysmans, Debusschere, Ducoulombier (Lawarée, 55), Schaessens, De Nil, Karagiannis, Edmilson, Wamberto, Teppers, Lukaku.
FC Dynamo: Smetanin, Timofeev, Samatov, Shulgin, Smirnov, Chernyshov (captain), Klyuyev, Cheryshev, Tetradze (Borodkin, 69), Ivanov, Simutenkov.
 27 September 1994 / FC Dynamo Moscow – R.F.C. Seraing 0–1 (Schaessens ) / Dynamo Stadium, Moscow / Attendance: 5,000
FC Dynamo: Smetanin, Timofeev, Samatov, S. Nekrasov, Smirnov (Kutsenko, 41), Chernyshov (captain), Klyuyev, Cheryshev, Yakhimovich, Ivanov, Simutenkov.
R.F.C. Seraing: Heinen, Ngombo, Debusschere, Ducoulombier, Schaessens, De Nil, Karagiannis, Edmilson (Houben, 46), Lawarée, Teppers (Van den Bergh, 62), Lukaku.

Second round
 18 October 1994 / FC Dynamo Moscow – Real Madrid  2–2 (Simutenkov  Cheryshev  – Sandro  Zamorano ) / Dynamo Stadium, Moscow / Attendance: 7,000
FC Dynamo: Smetanin, Timofeev, Kovtun, S. Nekrasov, Samatov, Chernyshov (captain), Klyuyev, Cheryshev, Yakhimovich, Ivanov, Simutenkov.
Real Madrid: Cañizares, Chendo, Luis Enrique, Hierro, Milla, Alkorta, Butragueño (Dubovský, 71), Amavisca, Zamorano, Martín Vázquez, Sandro (Míchel, 71).
 1 November 1994 / Real Madrid – FC Dynamo Moscow 4–0 (Zamorano  Redondo  Dani  ) / Santiago Bernabéu Stadium, Madrid / Attendance: 60,000
Real Madrid: Buyo, Sánchez Flores, Luis Enrique, Hierro (Chendo, 46), Redondo, Sanchís, Butragueño, Míchel, Zamorano (Dani, 71), Laudrup, Amavisca.
FC Dynamo: Smetanin, Samatov, Kovtun, Khidiyatullin (Borodkin, 61), Shulgin, S. Nekrasov, Filippov (Klyuyev, 12), Cheryshev, Yakhimovich, Ivanov, Simutenkov.

UEFA Cup Winners' Cup 1995–96
Manager: Adamas Golodets.

First round
 14 September 1995 / FC Dynamo Moscow – FC Ararat Yerevan  3–1 (Teryokhin   Safronov  – Stepanyan ) / Dynamo Stadium, Moscow / Attendance: 7,500
FC Dynamo: Smetanin (captain), Yakhimovich, Shulgin, Kolotovkin, Sabitov (Tishkov, 79), Kobelev (A. Grishin, 55), Samatov, Cheryshev (Safronov, 62), S. Nekrasov, Kuznetsov, Teryokhin.
FC Ararat Yerevan: Petrosyan, Shahgeldyan, Gspeyan, Tonoyan, Stepanyan, Hayrapetyan, Mkryan, Ter-Petrosyan (Nazaryan, 84), Mkhitaryan (Harutyunyan, 46), Kocharyan, Voskanyan.
 28 September 1995 / FC Ararat Yerevan – FC Dynamo Moscow 0–1 (Teryokhin ) / Hrazdan Stadium, Yerevan / Attendance: 20,000
FC Ararat Yerevan: Petrosyan, Shahgeldyan, Gspeyan, Tonoyan, Stepanyan (Harutyunyan, 66), Nigoyan, Mkryan, Ter-Petrosyan, Mkhitaryan, Hayrapetyan, Voskanyan (Kocharyan, 46).
FC Dynamo: Kleimyonov, A. Grishin (Kobelev, 85), Kovtun, Kolotovkin, Shulgin,  Kuznetsov, Samatov, Cheryshev, S. Nekrasov (Safronov, 85), Podpaly (captain), Teryokhin.

Second round
 19 October 1995 / FC Dynamo Moscow – SK Hradec Králové  1–0 (Kuznetsov ) / Dynamo Stadium, Moscow / Attendance: 4,000
FC Dynamo: Kleimyonov, Kuznetsov, Kovtun, S. Nekrasov, Shulgin,  Kobelev (A. Grishin, 46), Samatov, Cheryshev, Safronov, Podpaly (captain), Tishkov (Kutsenko, 78).
SK Hradec Králové: Vahala, Řehák (Vrabel, 76), Urban, Šmarda, Dzubara, Ptáček (Drozd, 77), Kaplan (Holub, 64), Urbánek, Černý, Mašek, Hynek.
 2 November 1995 / SK Hradec Králové – FC Dynamo Moscow 1–0 (Kaplan ) 1–3 in shootout (Drozd  Černý  Dzubara  Holub  – Kobelev  Teryokhin  Samatov  Kovtun ) / Všesportovní Stadion, Hradec Králové / Attendance: 11,540
SK Hradec Králové: Vahala, Řehák, Dzubara, Urbánek, Urban, Drozd, Ulich, Černý, Kaplan (Zoubek, 74, Ptáček, 119), Holub, Hynek.
FC Dynamo: Smetanin, Kuznetsov, Kovtun, Kolotovkin, Yakhimovich,  A. Grishin, Samatov, Cheryshev (Kobelev, 120), Safronov (Tishkov, 70), Podpaly (captain), Teryokhin.

Quarterfinals
 7 March 1996 / FC Dynamo Moscow – SK Rapid Wien  0–1 (Stumpf ) / Lokomotiv Stadium, Moscow / Attendance: 8,300
FC Dynamo: Smetanin (captain), Yakhimovich, Kovtun, Shulgin (Kutsenko, 63), Nekrasov, Kobelev, Samatov, Cheryshev (Tishkov, 40), Safronov (A. Grishin, 39), Kuznetsov, Teryokhin.
SK Rapid Wien: Konsel, Hatz, Guggi, Ivanov, Schöttel, Stöger, Stumpf, Marasek, Jancker, Jovanovic, Heraf.
 21 March 1996 / SK Rapid Wien – FC Dynamo Moscow 3–0 (Jancker   Stöger  Jovanovic  – Cheryshev  Teryokhin ) / Ernst-Happel-Stadion, Vienna / Attendance: 44,000
SK Rapid Wien: Konsel, Hatz, Guggi, Ivanov, Schöttel, Stöger, Stumpf, Marasek, Jancker, Jovanovic, Heraf.
FC Dynamo: Smetanin (captain), Yakhimovich, Kovtun, Shulgin (Safronov, 59), Nekrasov, Kobelev, Samatov (Lemeshko, 65), Cheryshev, A. Grishin (Tishkov, 56), Podpaly, Teryokhin.

1996–97 UEFA Cup
Manager: Adamas Golodets.

Qualifying round
 6 August 1996 / FC Dynamo Moscow – FC Jazz Pori  1–1 (Kobelev  – Laaksonen ) / Dynamo Stadium, Moscow / Attendance: 2,500
FC Dynamo: Smetanin (captain), Yakhimovich, Kovtun, Kolotovkin, Shtanyuk, Kobelev, S. Grishin, Tishkov, Kuznetsov, A. Grishin, Artyomov (R. Gusev, 33).
FC Jazz Pori: Siitonen, Nieminen, Rantanen, Sulonen, Riippa (Puputti, 65), Ollikkala, Leivo-Jokimäki, Koskikangas (Roiko, 68), Luiz Antônio (Santos, 79), Piracaia, Laaksonen.
 20 August 1996 / FC Jazz Pori – FC Dynamo Moscow 1–3 (Leivo-Jokimäki  Rantanen  – Kobelev  Artyomov  ) / Porin Stadion, Pori / Attendance: 9,500
FC Jazz Pori: Siitonen, Nieminen, Rantanen, Sulonen, Riippa, Ollikkala, Leivo-Jokimäki (Suikkanen, 65), Luiz Antônio, Piracaia, Laaksonen (Santos, 82), Puputti (Roiko, 75).
FC Dynamo: Smetanin (captain), Yakhimovich, Kovtun, Kolotovkin, Shtanyuk, Kobelev (Gushchin, 80), S. Grishin, Tishkov, R. Gusev, A. Grishin (Artyomov, 54), Tochilin (Nekrasov, 73).

First round
 10 September 1996 / A.S. Roma  – FC Dynamo Moscow 3–0 (Tommasi  Fonseca  ) / Stadio Olimpico, Rome / Attendance: 60,000
A.S. Roma: Sterchele, Trotta, Lanna, Annoni, Thern, Aldair, Tommasi, Balbo (Berretta, 31), Totti (Grossi, 56), Fonseca (Bernardini, 80), Di Biagio.
FC Dynamo: Smetanin (captain), Yakhimovich, Nekrasov, Kolotovkin, Shtanyuk, Kobelev, S. Grishin, Cheryshev, Kuznetsov (R. Gusev, 67), A. Grishin, Tochilin (Tishkov, 24).
 24 September 1996 / FC Dynamo Moscow – A.S. Roma 1–3 (Kobelev  – Fonseca  Tommasi  Berretta ) / Dynamo Stadium, Moscow / Attendance: 5,000
FC Dynamo: Kleimyonov, Dyomin, Kovtun, Kolotovkin, Gushchin (R. Gusev, 46), Kobelev (captain) (Nekrasov, 46), S. Grishin, Cheryshev, Kuznetsov (Kutsenko, 46), A. Grishin, Teryokhin.
A.S. Roma: Sterchele, Trotta, Lanna, Annoni, Thern, Aldair, Fonseca (Balbo, 46), Carboni, Di Biagio (Grossi, 73), Tommasi (Berretta, 73), Bernardini.

UEFA Intertoto Cup 1997
Manager: Adamas Golodets.

Group stage
 29 June 1997 / FC Dynamo Moscow – Panachaiki  2–1 (Shtanyuk , Kutsenko  – Klejch ) / Dynamo Stadium, Moscow / Attendance: 3,500
FC Dynamo: Tiapushkin, Tochilin (Zharinov, 68), Kovtun, Ostrovskiy (Korablyov, 75), Shtanyuk, Kulchiy, Grishin, Skokov (Gusev, 78), Kutsenko, Nekrasov, Teryokhin.
Panachaiki: Karasavvas, Katribouzas (Ioannou, 77), Komianos, Meidanis, Argyropoulos, Kyriakopoulos (Kordonouris, 46), Mimpo, Katsouranis (Haxhi, 60), Klejch, Karipov, Samaras.
 5 July 1997 / B36 Tórshavn  – FC Dynamo Moscow 0–1 (Ostrovskiy ) / Svangaskarð, Toftir / Attendance: 500
B36 Tórshavn: Høgnesen, Johansen, T. E. Hansen, Joensen, Sivić, J.K. Hansen, Johnsson, Johannesen, Borg (Mørk, 85), Petersen, Danielsen.
FC Dynamo: Tiapushkin, Tochilin, Kovtun, Ostrovskiy, Shtanyuk, Kulchiy, Grishin (Tishkov, 7), Skokov, Kutsenko, Nekrasov, Gusev (Kulyov, 57).
 12 July 1997 / FC Dynamo Moscow – Racing Genk  3–2 (Teryokhin  Kulchiy  Korablyov  - Oularé  Keita ) / Dynamo Stadium, Moscow / Attendance: 3,000
FC Dynamo: Tiapushkin, Tochilin (Gusev, 38), Kovtun, Ostrovskiy, Korablyov, Kobelev (captain), Zharinov, Kutsenko (Kulyov, 61), Kulchiy, Nekrasov, Teryokhin.
Racing Genk: Brockhauser, Peeters, Kimoni, Oyen, Delbroek, Olivieri, Bukalski, Clement (Nsumbu, 70), Oularé, Guðjónsson (Hendrikx, 58), Keita (Strupar, 58).
 19 July 1997 / Stabæk  – FC Dynamo Moscow 1–1 (Skistad  – Kosolapov ) / Nadderud stadion, Bærum / Attendance: 2,000
Stabæk: Røvde, Holter, Flem, Skistad, Basma, Stenersen (Løken, 46), Svindal Larsen, Jansson, Grimstad (Hanssen, 46), Kolle, Frigård (Stavrum, 61).
FC Dynamo: Tiapushkin, Korablyov, Kozlov, Tochilin, Povorov, Zharinov, Likhobabenko, Kulyov, Kutsenko (Gordeyev, 72), Gusev (Sherstnyov, 77), Kosolapov (Artyomov, 65).

Semifinals
 27 July 1997 / FC Dynamo Moscow – MSV Duisburg  2–2 (Teryokhin   – Osthoff  Salou ) / Dynamo Stadium, Moscow / Attendance: 5,000
FC Dynamo: Tiapushkin, Kutsenko (Kosolapov, 75), Kovtun, Ostrovskiy, Shtanyuk, Kobelev (captain), Zharinov (Tochilin, 66), Skokov, Kulchiy, Nekrasov, Teryokhin.
MSV Duisburg: Gill, Emmerling, Wohlert, Reiter, Wolters (Puschmann, 68), Komljenović, Zeyer (Osthoff, 50), Steffen, Hirsch, Salou, Spies (Hajto, 84).
 30 July 1997 / MSV Duisburg – FC Dynamo Moscow 3–1 (Wohlert   Gill  – Kobelev  Kovtun  Teryokhin ) / Wedaustadion, Duisburg / Attendance: 8,650
MSV Duisburg: Gill, Hopp (Wolters, 72), Hirsch, Wohlert, Hajto, Komljenović, Osthoff, Salou, Neun, Zeyer (Spies, 58), Emmerling.
FC Dynamo: Tiapushkin, Tochilin (Gusev, 56), Kovtun, Ostrovskiy, Shtanyuk, Kobelev (captain), Kutsenko (Kosolapov, 60), Skokov, Kulchiy, Nekrasov, Teryokhin.

1998–99 UEFA Cup
Manager: Aleksei Petrushin.

Second qualifying round
 11 August 1998 / Polonia Warsaw  – FC Dynamo Moscow 0–1 (Gusev ) / Stadion Polonii Warszawa, Warsaw / Attendance: 2,500
Polonia Warsaw: Szczęsny, Sadzawicki, Žvirgždauskas, Gałuszka, Dąbrowski, Moskal (Mikulėnas, 58), Wdowczyk (Żewłakow, 88), Jałocha, Olisadebe, Vencevičius (Bąk, 77), Wędzyński.
FC Dynamo: Kramarenko, Yakhimovich, Korablyov (Šemberas, 80), Ostrovskiy, Shtanyuk, Kobelev (captain) (Golovskoy, 55), Gusev, Romaschenko, Nekrasov, Isibor, Danilevičius.
 25 August 1998 / FC Dynamo Moscow – Polonia Warsaw 1–0 (Teryokhin ) / Dynamo Stadium, Moscow / Attendance: 4,600
FC Dynamo: Tiapushkin, Yakhimovich, Korablyov (Golovskoy, 46), Ostrovskiy, Shtanyuk, Kobelev (captain) (Skokov, 90), Gusev, Romaschenko, Nekrasov, Danilevičius (Kulchiy, 61), Teryokhin.
Polonia Warsaw: Szczęsny, Sadzawicki, Žvirgždauskas, Żewłakow, Gałuszka, Wędzyński, Dąbrowski, Mikulėnas (Moskal, 81), Wdowczyk (Jałocha, 67), Bartczak, Olisadebe (Bąk, 70).

First round
 15 September 1998 / FC Dynamo Moscow – Skonto FC  2–2 (Golovskoy  Ostrovskiy  – Miholaps  Pahars ) / Dynamo Stadium, Moscow / Attendance: 5,000
FC Dynamo: Tiapushkin, Yakhimovich, Kovtun (Ostrovskiy, 46), Golovskoy, Shtanyuk, Kobelev (captain), Gusev, Romaschenko (Skokov, 36; Danilevičius, 76), Nekrasov, Isibor, Teryokhin.
Skonto FC: Karavajevs, Zemļinskis, Lobaņovs, Rekhviashvili, Pahars, Babicevs, Miholaps (Rimkus, 75), Melnyk (Pindeyev, 67), Rubins, Laizāns, Tereškinas (Līdaks, 52).
 29 September 1998 / Skonto FC – FC Dynamo Moscow 2–3 (Pahars   – Gusev  Līdaks  Teryokhin ) / Daugava Stadium, Riga / Attendance: 4,500
Skonto FC: Karavajevs, Laizāns, Zemļinskis, Lobaņovs, Tereškinas, Bleidelis, Līdaks (Rubins, 63), Astafjevs, Pahars, Babicevs, Miholaps (Rimkus, 63).
FC Dynamo: Tiapushkin, Golovskoy (Šemberas, 81), Kovtun, Ostrovskiy, Shtanyuk, Kobelev (captain), S. Grishin (Tochilin, 75), Gusev, Nekrasov, Danilevičius (Romaschenko, 54), Teryokhin.

Second round
 20 October 1998 / FC Dynamo Moscow – Real Sociedad  2–3 (Nekrasov   Shtanyuk  – Kovtun  de Pedro  ) / Dynamo Stadium, Moscow / Attendance: 8,000
FC Dynamo: Tiapushkin (Kramarenko, 14), Yakhimovich, Kovtun, Šemberas (Romaschenko, 79), Shtanyuk, Kobelev (captain), S. Grishin, Gusev, Nekrasov, Danilevičius (Isibor, 46), Teryokhin.
Real Sociedad: Alberto, Aranzábal, Gómez, Loren, Sá Pinto (Adepoju, 46), Kovačević, de Pedro (Gracia, 68), Antía, López Rekarte, Aldeondo (de Paula, 83), Kühbauer.
 3 November 1998 / Real Sociedad – FC Dynamo Moscow 3–0 (Kovačević   de Paula ) / Estadio Anoeta, San Sebastián / Attendance: 16,000
Real Sociedad: Alberto, Aranzábal, Antía, Gómez, Loren, Sá Pinto, Kovačević (Idiakez, 78), de Pedro, de Paula (Cvitanović, 73), López Rekarte, Kühbauer (Jauregi, 82).
FC Dynamo: Tiapushkin, Yakhimovich (Tochilin, 46), Kovtun, Ostrovskiy, Golovskoy (Šemberas, 84), Kobelev (captain), Romaschenko, Gusev, Nekrasov, Isibor (Kulchiy, 55), Teryokhin.

2000–01 UEFA Cup
Manager: Valery Gazzaev.

First round
 14 September 2000 / Lillestrøm SK  – FC Dynamo Moscow 3–1 (Kristinsson   Kihlberg  – Romaschenko ) / Åråsen stadion, Lillestrøm / Attendance: 3,500
Lillestrøm SK: Misund, Bjarmann, Hansén, Kihlberg, Fjeldstad (Hjartarson, 90), Kristinsson, Helland, Berget, Sundgot, Werni, Berntsen.
FC Dynamo: Tumilovich, Yakhimovich, Šemberas, Tochilin, Romaschenko, Ayupov, Gusev (captain), Medvedev, Gogniyev (Česnauskis, 90), Bystrov (S. Grishin, 61), V. Grishin.
 28 September 2000 / FC Dynamo Moscow – Lillestrøm SK 2–1 (Romaschenko  Shtanyuk  – Sundgot ) / Dynamo Stadium, Moscow / Attendance: 5,000
FC Dynamo: Tumilovich, Šemberas, Tochilin, V. Grishin, Shtanyuk (captain), Romaschenko, Ayupov, Gusev, Bystrov, Medvedev (Česnauskis, 71), Gogniyev.
Lillestrøm SK: Baron, Bjarmann, Hansén, Strand (Powell, 46), Kihlberg, Fjeldstad (Helland, 90), Kristinsson, Berget, Sundgot, Werni, Berntsen.

2001–02 UEFA Cup
Manager: Aleksandr Novikov.

First round
 20 September 2001 / FC Dynamo Moscow – Birkirkara F.C.  1–0 (Khazov ) / Dynamo Stadium, Moscow / Attendance: 4,000
FC Dynamo: Khomutovsky, Šemberas, Hornyák, Žutautas, Bystrov, Gusev (captain), Klyuyev, Khazov, Kharlachyov (Medvedev, 64; V. Grishin, 70), Novikov, Bulykin.
Birkirkara F.C: Savić, Tellus, Spiteri, Scicluna, Dronca, Suda, Camenzuli, Brincat, Calascione (Cutajar, 67), Nwoko, Zahra.

 27 September 2001 / Birkirkara F.C. – FC Dynamo Moscow 0–0 / Ta' Qali Stadium, Ta' Qali / Attendance: 7,000
FC Dynamo: Khomutovsky, Šemberas, Tochilin, Hornyák, Žutautas, Novikov, Bystrov, Gusev (captain), Klyuyev (Česnauskis, 46), Khazov, V. Grishin.
Birkirkara F.C: Savić, Tellus, Scicluna, Spiteri, Dronca, Suda, Camenzuli, Nwoko, Calascione (Fenech, 79), Zahra, Galea (Cutajar, 68).

Second round
 18 October 2001 / Rangers F.C.  – FC Dynamo Moscow 3–1 (Amoruso  Ball  de Boer  – Gusev ) / Ibrox Stadium, Glasgow / Attendance: 48,200
Rangers F.C.: Klos, Ricksen, Moore (Ball, 46), Amoruso, Numan, Konterman, Reyna, de Boer, Ferguson, Flo (McCann, 66), Caniggia.
FC Dynamo: Khomutovsky, Šemberas, Tochilin, Hornyák, Žutautas, Zharinov, Bystrov (Kharlachyov, 80), Gusev (captain), Bulykin (Medvedev, 46), V. Grishin (Dyatel, 86), Nemov.

 1 November 2001 / FC Dynamo Moscow – Rangers F.C. 1–4 (Gusev  – R. de Boer  Khomutovsky  Flo  Løvenkrands ) / Dynamo Stadium, Moscow / Attendance: 7,000
FC Dynamo: Khomutovsky, Šemberas, Tochilin, Hornyák, Žutautas, Bystrov (Nemov, 86), Gusev (captain) (Medvedev, 46), Novikov, Bulykin, V. Grishin, Dyatel (Česnauskis, 46).
Rangers F.C.: Klos, Ricksen, Moore, Amoruso, Numan, Ferguson, Caniggia (Latapy, 75), Flo (Mols, 80), Reyna, de Boer (Løvenkrands, 75), Konterman.

UEFA Champions League 2009–10
Manager: Andrei Kobelev.

Third qualifying round

 29 July 2009 / Celtic F.C.  – FC Dynamo Moscow 0–1 (Kokorin ) / Celtic Park, Glasgow / Attendance: 55,000
Celtic F.C.: Boruc, Hinkel, Naylor, Caldwell, N'Guémo, McDonald (Killen, 61), Fortuné (Samaras, 60), Maloney, Donati (Fox, 67), Loovens, McGeady.
FC Dynamo: Gabulov, Kowalczyk, Fernández, K. Kombarov, D. Kombarov, Kerzhakov, Granat, Wilkshire, Kolodin, Svezhov, Kokorin (Smolov, 74).
 5 August 2009 / FC Dynamo Moscow – Celtic F.C. 0–2 (McDonald  Samaras ) / Arena Khimki, Khimki / Attendance: 13,753
FC Dynamo: Gabulov, Kowalczyk, Kolodin, Fernández (Ropotan, 90+4), Granat, K. Kombarov, Khokhlov, Wilkshire, Svezhov (Kokorin, 84), D. Kombarov, Kerzhakov.
Celtic F.C.: Boruc, Hinkel, Caldwell, N'Guémo, McDonald (Samaras, 79), Fortuné (Brown, 69), Fox, Maloney, Donati, Loovens, McGeady.

UEFA Europa League 2009–10
Manager: Andrei Kobelev.

Play-off round
 20 August 2009 / PFC CSKA Sofia  – FC Dynamo Moscow 0–0 / Vasil Levski National Stadium, Sofia / Attendance: 25,000
PFC CSKA: Karadzhov, Vidanov, Yanchev, Kotev, Timonov (Delev, 58), Orlinov (Zehirov, 62), Ivanov, Yanev (Paskov, 70), Todorov, Morozs, Minev.
FC Dynamo: Gabulov, Kowalczyk, Fernández, K. Kombarov, Khokhlov (Ropotan, 85), Kerzhakov, Granat, Wilkshire, Kolodin, Kokorin (Aguiar, 68), D. Kombarov.

 27 August 2009 / FC Dynamo Moscow – PFC CSKA Sofia 1–2 (Kerzhakov  – Delev  Ivanov ) / Arena Khimki, Khimki / Attendance: 8,486
FC Dynamo: Gabulov, Kowalczyk (Smolov, 61), Kolodin, Fernández, Granat (Kokorin, 57), K. Kombarov, Khokhlov, Wilkshire, Aguiar (Dimidko, 46), D. Kombarov, Kerzhakov.
PFC CSKA: Karadzhov, Vidanov, Yanchev, Kotev, Ivanov, Marquinhos (Timonov, 21), Todorov (Yanev, 75), Morozs, Minev, Stoyanov, Delev (Paskov, 85).

UEFA Europa League 2012–13
Manager: Sergei Silkin (first game, third qualifying round), Dmitri Khokhlov (caretaker, second game, third qualifying round), Dan Petrescu (play-off round).

Third qualifying round
 2 August 2012 / Dundee United F.C.  – FC Dynamo Moscow 2–2 (Flood  Watson  – Semshov  Kokorin ) / Tannadice Park, Dundee / Attendance: 9,977
Dundee United: Cierzniak, Dillon, Douglas, Gunning, Flood, Russell, Rankin, Daly (captain), Ryan, Mackay-Steven, Watson.
FC Dynamo: Shunin, Schildenfeld, Dzsudzsák, Misimović, Kokorin, Semshov, Yusupov (Sapeta, 90+1), Kurányi (captain), Wilkshire, Lomić, Rykov.
 9 August 2012 / FC Dynamo Moscow – Dundee United F.C. 5–0 (Semshov  Kokorin  Yusupov  Sapeta ) / Arena Khimki, Khimki / Attendance: 9,063
FC Dynamo: Berezovsky, Fernández, Dzsudzsák (Bakkal, 63), Misimović, Kokorin, Semshov, Yusupov (Sapeta, 64), Kurányi (captain), Wilkshire, Lomić, Rykov (Schildenfeld, 63).
Dundee United: Cierzniak, Douglas, McLean, Gunning, Flood, Russell (Gardyne, 78), Rankin (Armstrong, 59), Daly (captain), Ryan, Mackay-Steven (Dow, 86), Watson.

Play-off round
 22 August 2012 / VfB Stuttgart  – FC Dynamo Moscow 2–0 (Ibišević ) / Mercedes-Benz Arena, Stuttgart / Attendance: 20,400
Stuttgart: Ulreich, Boka, Tasci (captain), Rodríguez, Hoogland, Kvist, Gentner, Okazaki (Traoré, 62), Hajnal (Cacau, 77), Harnik (Torun, 62), Ibišević.
FC Dynamo: Shunin, Lomić, Schildenfeld, Fernández, Wilkshire, Yusupov, Noboa, Dzsudzsák, Misimović (Semshov, 38), Nyakhaychyk (Granat, 85), Kurányi (captain) (Panyukov, 75).
 28 August 2012 / FC Dynamo Moscow – VfB Stuttgart 1–1 (Kokorin  – Ibišević ) / Arena Khimki, Khimki / Attendance: 9,000
FC Dynamo: Shunin, Granat, Schildenfeld, Fernández (captain), Chicherin, Noboa, Sapeta (Semshov, 61), Lomić, Kokorin, Dzsudzsák (Nyakhaychyk, 68), Kurányi (Misimović, 68).
Stuttgart: Ulreich, Boka (Molinaro, 74), Tasci (captain), Rodríguez, Sakai, Kvist, Gentner, Okazaki, Hajnal, Harnik (Torun, 68), Ibišević (Cacau, 68).

UEFA Europa League 2014–15
Manager: Stanislav Cherchesov

Third qualifying round
 31 July 2014 / FC Dynamo Moscow – Ironi Kiryat Shmona  1–1 (Kurányi  – Kola ) / Arena Khimki, Khimki / Attendance: 7,583 
FC Dynamo: Gabulov, Büttner, Samba, Vainqueur, Dzsudzsák, Ionov, Granat (captain), Noboa (Kokorin, 54), Kurányi, Manolev, Denisov.
Ironi Kiryat Shmona: Haimov, Kassio, Tzedek (captain), Dilmoni, Abed (Mizrahi, 84), Kola (Mayo, 90+2), Manga (Rochet, 71), Elkayam, Broun, Panka, Kahat.

 7 August 2014 / Ironi Kiryat Shmona – FC Dynamo Moscow 1–2 (Kahat  – Kurányi  Ionov ) / GSP Stadium, Nicosia (Israeli clubs were playing their home games at neutral field due to Israel–Gaza conflict) / Attendance: 464
Ironi Kiryat Shmona: Haimov, Kassio, Tzedek (captain), Dilmoni (Pinas, 72), Abed (Rochet, 84),  Kola, Manga, Elkayam, Broun, Panka (Mizrahi, 75), Kahat.
FC Dynamo: Berezovsky, Büttner, Samba, Vainqueur, Dzsudzsák (Zhirkov, 68), Kokorin, Ionov (Smolov, 62), Granat (captain), Kurányi (Noboa, 58), Kozlov, Denisov.

Play-off round
 21 August 2014 / FC Dynamo Moscow – Omonia  2–2 (Samba  Büttner  – Lobjanidze  Fofana ) / Arena Khimki, Khimki / Attendance: 6,381
FC Dynamo: Berezovsky, Samba, Douglas, Vainqueur, Dzsudzsák, Kokorin , Ionov (Büttner, 36), Granat (captain), Valbuena (Manolev, 90), Kurányi, Denisov.
Omonia: Moreira (captain), Lobjanidze, Stepanov, Rodri, Cristóvão, Nuno Assis (Grigalashvili, 77), Fofana (Kyriakou, 86), Margaça, Poté (Roberto, 71), Serginho, Acquistapace.

 28 August 2014 / Omonia – FC Dynamo Moscow 1–2 (Poté  – Stepanov  Samba ) / GSP Stadium, Nicosia / Attendance: 20,081
Omonia: Moreira (captain), Lobjanidze, Stepanov, Rodri, Cristóvão, Nuno Assis (Grigalashvili, 90), Fofana (Kyriakou, 86), Margaça, Poté (Roberto, 74), Serginho, Acquistapace.
FC Dynamo: Berezovsky, Büttner (Prudnikov, 83), Samba, Douglas, Vainqueur , Dzsudzsák (Noboa, 75),  Ionov  (Zhirkov, 68), Valbuena, Kurányi, Manolev, Denisov (captain).

Group stage
 18 September 2014 / Panathinaikos  – FC Dynamo Moscow 1–2 (Dinas  – Kokorin  Ionov ) / Apostolos Nikolaidis Stadium, Athens / Attendance: 14,000
Panathinaikos: Kotsolis, Triantafyllopoulos, Mendes da Silva, Klonaridis (Donis, 58), Lagos (Petrić, 75), Zeca (captain), Karelis, Nano, Schildenfeld, Dinas, Pranjić (Koutroubis, 80).
FC Dynamo Moscow: Gabulov, Büttner (Granat, 69), Samba, Douglas, Dzsudzsák, Yusupov, Kokorin (Hubočan, 89), Ionov, Noboa, Kurányi  (captain) (Prudnikov, 90+3), Manolev.

 2 October 2014 / FC Dynamo Moscow – PSV Eindhoven  1–0 (Zhirkov ) / Arena Khimki, Khimki / Attendance: 7,872
FC Dynamo Moscow: Gabulov, Büttner, Samba, Douglas, Vainqueur, Dzsudzsák (Zhirkov, 61), Yusupov, Kokorin (captain), Ionov (Valbuena, 73), Hubočan, Noboa (Kurányi, 68).
PSV Eindhoven: Zoet, Rekik, Arias, Bruma, Maher (Ritzmaier, 86), Wijnaldum (captain), Narsingh, Jozefzoon (Vloet, 84), Willems, Locadia, Hendrix.

 23 October 2014 / Estoril  – FC Dynamo Moscow 1–2 (Yohan Tavares  – Kokorin  Zhirkov ) / Estádio António Coimbra da Mota, Estoril / Attendance: 2,164
Estoril: Vagner (captain), Yohan Tavares, Bruno Miguel, Anderson Luiz, Kléber  (Cabrera, 81), Esiti, Sebá (Ricardo Vaz, 85), Kuca, Diogo Amado, Rúben Fernandes, Tozé (Arthuro, 77).
FC Dynamo Moscow: Gabulov, Büttner, Samba, Douglas, Vainqueur, Kokorin  (Kurányi, 75), Ionov (Zhirkov, 56), Valbuena (Rotenberg, 90+2), Kozlov, Denisov (captain).

 6 November 2014 / FC Dynamo Moscow – Estoril 1–0 (Kurányi ) / Arena Khimki, Khimki / Attendance: 5,374
FC Dynamo Moscow: Gabulov, Büttner, Samba, Douglas, Vainqueur, Dzsudzsák (Zhirkov, 76), Kokorin  (captain) (Kurányi, 74), Ionov, Valbuena (Yusupov, 86), Hubočan, Denisov.
Estoril: Kieszek, Yohan Tavares (captain), Anderson Luiz (Filipe Gonçalves, 87), Kléber (Bruno Lopes, 73), Esiti, Sebá, Kuca, Emídio Rafael, Diogo Amado (Ricardo Vaz, 82), Rúben Fernandes, Tozé.

 27 November 2014 / FC Dynamo Moscow – Panathinaikos 2–1 (Triantafyllopoulos  Ionov  – Berg  / Arena Khimki, Khimki / Attendance: 4,207
FC Dynamo Moscow:  Gabulov, Büttner, Samba, Douglas, Vainqueur, Ionov (Dzsudzsák, 81), Valbuena, Noboa, Zhirkov (Yusupov, 73), Kurányi (captain)  (Prudnikov, 88), Rotenberg.
Panathinaikos: Kotsolis, Triantafyllopoulos, Mendes da Silva (Pranjić, 86), Lagos (captain), Berg (Klonaridis, 78), Bajrami, Donis, Nano, Schildenfeld, Bourbos (Koutroubis, 56), Petrić.

 11 December 2014 / PSV Eindhoven – FC Dynamo Moscow 0–1 (Ionov ) / Philips Stadion, Eindhoven / Attendance: 25,000
PSV Eindhoven: Pasveer, Isimat-Mirin, Rekik, Maher (Wijnaldum, 81), Depay (de Jong, 67), Jozefzoon, Willems, Locadia, Guardado (captain), Brenet, Hendrix (Ritzmaier, 67).
FC Dynamo Moscow:  Shunin, Douglas, Vainqueur (Ionov, 59), Dzsudzsák (Tashayev, 90+3), Yusupov,  Valbuena, Hubočan, Noboa, Kurányi (captain)  (Prudnikov, 68),  Manolev, Kozlov.

Round of 32
 19 February 2015 / Anderlecht  – FC Dynamo Moscow 0–0 / Constant Vanden Stock Stadium, Anderlecht / Attendance: 17,317
Anderlecht: Proto (captain), N'Sakala, Deschacht, Najar, Rolando, Defour (Colin, 67), Acheampong (Kabasele, 86), Tielemans, Dendoncker, Vanden Borre (Leya Iseka, 83), Mitrović.
FC Dynamo Moscow: Gabulov, Büttner , Samba, Vainqueur, Dzsudzsák (Zhirkov, 69), Yusupov, Kokorin  (captain), Valbuena (Ionov, 80), Hubočan, Kurányi (Denisov, 51), Kozlov.

 26 February 2015 / FC Dynamo Moscow – Anderlecht 3–1 (Kozlov  Yusupov  Kurányi  – Mitrović ) / Arena Khimki, Khimki / Attendance: 12,316
FC Dynamo Moscow: Gabulov, Samba, Vainqueur, Dzsudzsák (Ionov, 68), Yusupov, Kokorin  (captain) , Valbuena (Kurányi, 84), Hubočan, Zhirkov, Kozlov (Douglas, 53), Denisov.
Anderlecht: Proto (captain), N'Sakala, Deschacht, Rolando, Defour, Acheampong, Conté (Cyriac, 81), Tielemans (Najar, 71), Dendoncker  (Leya Iseka, 81), Vanden Borre, Mitrović.

Round of 16
 12 March 2015 / Napoli  – FC Dynamo Moscow 3–1 (Higuaín  – Kurányi ) / Stadio San Paolo, Naples / Attendance: 17,727
Napoli: Andújar, Henrique, Britos, de Guzmán (Hamšík, 70), Callejón (Zúñiga, 82), Jorginho, Higuaín, Mertens, Koulibaly (Albiol, 8), Ghoulam, Inler (captain).
FC Dynamo Moscow: Gabulov, Samba, Vainqueur, Dzsudzsák (Tashayev, 90+2), Kokorin  (captain), Valbuena (Ionov, 72), Hubočan, Zhirkov, Kurányi (Büttner, 62), Kozlov, Zobnin .

 19 March 2015 / FC Dynamo Moscow – Napoli 0–0 / Arena Khimki, Khimki / Attendance: 17,356
FC Dynamo Moscow: Gabulov, Büttner (Ionov, 85), Samba, Vainqueur, Dzsudzsák, Kokorin  (captain), Valbuena, Hubočan, Zhirkov, Kurányi, Kozlov.
Napoli: Andújar, Britos, Callejón, Jorginho, Higuaín (Zúñiga, 81), Maggio (captain), Mertens (de Guzmán, 63), David López, Gabbiadini (Hamšík, 71), Ghoulam, Albiol.

UEFA Europa League 2020–21
Manager: Kirill Novikov.

Second qualifying round
 17 September 2020 / Lokomotive Tbilisi  - Dynamo 2–1 (Sikharulidze  Gavashelishvili  – Komlichenko ) / Mikheil Meskhi Stadium, Tbilisi / Attendance: 0 (due to COVID-19 pandemic in Europe) 
FC Lokomotive Tbilisi: Mamardashvili, Sandokhadze, Gabadze, Gureshidze, Ubilava, Shonia, Samurkasovi (Dzebniauri, 62), Kirkitadze (Kobakhidze, 83), Dartsmelia, Oulad Omar (Gavashelishvili, 65), Sikharulidze.
FC Dynamo: Shunin, Parshivlyuk, Ordets, Skopintsev (Morozov, 46), Yevgenyev, Kaboré, Philipp (Igboun, 69), Fomin, Szymański, N'Jie (Lesovoy, 61), Komlichenko.

Note: The qualifying rounds were played in one-leg format due to COVID-19 pandemic in Europe.

References

FC Dynamo Moscow
Dynamo Moscow
Soviet football clubs in international competitions